Kurt Andersson (born 24 April 1939) is a Swedish footballer. He played in one match for the Sweden national football team in 1964.

References

External links
 
 

1939 births
Living people
Swedish footballers
Sweden international footballers
Association football forwards
AIK Fotboll players
Udinese Calcio players
S.S.D. Varese Calcio players
Swedish expatriate footballers
Expatriate footballers in Italy